The Lwów dialect is a subdialect (gwara) of the Polish language characteristic of the inhabitants of the city of Lviv, now in Ukraine. Based on the substratum of the Lesser Polish dialect, it was heavily influenced by borrowings (mostly lexical) from other languages spoken in Galicia, notably Ukrainian (Ruthenian), German and Yiddish, but also by Czech and Hungarian.

One of the peculiarities of the Lwów dialect was its popularity. Unlike many other Polish dialects, it was seen by its speakers as neither inferior to standard Polish nor denoting people of humble origin. That caused it to be used both by common people and university professors alike. It was also one of the first Polish dialects to be properly classified and to have a dictionary published. Despite that, the best known form of the Lwów dialect was the bałak, a sociolect of the lower class (batiars), street hooligans and youngsters.

History 
The Lwów dialect emerged in the 19th century and gained much popularity and recognition in the 1920s and 1930s, in part due to countrywide popularity of numerous artists and comedians using it.  Among them were Marian Hemar, Szczepcio, and Tońcio, the latter two being authors of the highly acclaimed  weekly broadcast in the Polish Radio. Emanuel Szlechter, the screenwriter of many popular films, such as The Vagabonds and songwriter of Polish pre-war hits, wrote some of his songs in the Lwów dialect ("Ni ma jak Lwów" "Nothing is like Lwow", a song from The Vagabonds).

The dialect is one of the two main sources of galicisms ( – words originating from the Kingdom of Galicia and Lodomeria) in standard Polish. Some elements of the dialect remain in use in contemporary Ukrainian spoken in modern Lviv.

In 1939, the city of Lwów was annexed by the Soviet Union and in the turbulent decade that followed the pre-war population structure of the city changed dramatically. With most of the Polish population expelled, the number of speakers of the dialect sharply declined, but the modern language of the members of Polish minority in Ukraine living in Lviv still resembles the prewar Lwów dialect. It is also cultivated by émigré circles abroad. It remained not only a part of popular culture in post-war Poland thanks to numerous artists and writers, notably Witold Szolginia, Adam Hollanek, and Jerzy Janicki, but also part of the language of many notable personalities who were born in Lwów before the war. Speakers of the Lwów dialect can be found in such cities as Wrocław and Bytom, where the majority of the expelled Polish inhabitants of Lwów settled.

Phonology

Vowels 
Among the most characteristic phonological features of the Lwów dialect were the changes in vowel quality influenced by word stress. For example:

 unstressed ie, e merging into i, y:
 in syllables before the stressed syllable: Standard Polish człowiekowi → Lwów dialect człuwikowi, wielbłądy → wilbłondy, kieliszkami → kiliszkami, ciekawy → cikawy, elektryczny → iliktryczny
 in syllables after the stressed syllable: Standard Polish człowiek → Lwów dialect człowik, nawet → nawyt, majątek → majontyk
 at the end of a word: Standard Polish ale → Lwów dialect ali, ciągle → wciągli, w Polsce → w Polscy, wasze piękne miasto → waszy pienkny miastu
 unstressed o merging into u:
 in syllables before the stressed syllable: Standard Polish oferma → Lwów dialect uferma, godzina → gudzina, kobita → kubita, doprowadził → dupruwadził
 in syllables after the stressed syllable: Standard Polish czegoś → Lwów dialect czeguś, ogon → ogun, ściskając → ściskajunc
 at the end of a word: Standard Polish jutro → Lwów dialect jutru

In songs, the vowels of some words were pronounced inconsistently. Differing musical rhythms could change which syllable of a word was stressed, which is why, for example, one could hear both policaj and pulicaj ("police") in the same song.

Consonants 
Younger speakers of the Lwów dialect often pronounced the consonant  as a semivowel (u̯) syllable-finally and word-finally. Unlike today's Standard Polish, however, the older articulation as a denti-alveolar (ɫ) was preserved before vowels (in words like pudełeczko ("box", diminutive) and łuk "bow").

Phonological changes 
In the Lwów dialect, as in other dialects, there were various phonological changes including assimilation, dissimilation and consonant cluster simplification.

References

External links
 Short dictionary of Lwów dialect on Polish Wiktionary
 Włóczęgi, a popular Polish film from 1939, which takes place in Lwów, and in which all characters speak the Lwów dialect (youtube link)

History of Lviv
Polish dialects
Languages of Ukraine
City colloquials